Radatice is a village and municipality in Prešov District in the Prešov Region of eastern Slovakia.

History
Radatice village was built in 1964.

Geography

Population 
It has a population of 805 people (2020-12-31).

References

External links
http://www.statistics.sk/mosmis/eng/run.html

Villages and municipalities in Prešov District
Šariš

hu:Radács